Symphyotrichum adnatum (formerly Aster adnatus) is a species of flowering plant in the family Asteraceae native to the southeastern United States and the Bahamas. Its flowers have lavender ray florets and yellow disk florets.

Citations

References

adnatum
Flora of the Southeastern United States
Flora of the Bahamas
Plants described in 1834
Taxa named by Thomas Nuttall